The 49th Academy Awards were presented Monday, March 28, 1977, at the Dorothy Chandler Pavilion in Los Angeles, California. The ceremonies were presided over by Richard Pryor, Ellen Burstyn, Jane Fonda, and Warren Beatty. Network and All the President's Men were the two biggest winners of the ceremony with four Oscars each, but Best Picture and Best Director, as well as Best Editing, were won by Rocky.

Network became the second film (after A Streetcar Named Desire) to win three acting Oscars, the last to do so until Everything Everywhere All at Once, and the last, as of the 94th Academy Awards, to receive five acting nominations. It was also the eleventh of fifteen films (to date) to receive nominations in all four acting categories. Best Actor winner Peter Finch became the first posthumous acting winner, having suffered a fatal heart attack in mid-January. With only five minutes and two seconds of screentime, Beatrice Straight set a record for the shortest performance ever to win an acting Oscar (Best Supporting Actress).

Piper Laurie was nominated for Best Supporting Actress for Carrie (1976), her first role since her Best Actress-nominated performance in The Hustler (1961), thus being nominated for two consecutive roles, fifteen years apart.

Lina Wertmüller became the first woman nominated for Best Director for Seven Beauties, which was also nominated for Best Foreign Language Film. With her win for Best Original Song as the composer for the love theme "Evergreen" from A Star Is Born, Barbra Streisand became the first woman to be honored in the category, and as of the 94th Academy Awards, the only person to have won Academy Awards for both acting and songwriting (following her Best Actress win for Funny Girl at the 40th Academy Awards).

No honorary awards were given this year.

ABC held the rights to the Oscars from 1960 to 1970, and regained them for 1976. For the second straight year, the ceremony was scheduled directly opposite the NCAA championship basketball game on NBC, won by Marquette in Al McGuire's final game as head coach.

Winners and nominees

Nominees were announced on February 10, 1977. Winners are listed first, highlighted in boldface and indicated with a double dagger.

Special Achievement Award
 Carlo Rambaldi, Glen Robinson, and Frank Van der Veer for the visual effects of King Kong
 L. B. Abbott, Glen Robinson, and Matthew Yuricich  for the visual effects of Logan's Run

Irving G. Thalberg Memorial Award
 Pandro S. Berman

Multiple nominations and awards

These films had multiple nominations:
10 nominations: Network and Rocky
8 nominations: All the President's Men
6 nominations: Bound for Glory
4 nominations: Seven Beauties, A Star Is Born and Taxi Driver
3 nominations: Cousin Cousine and Voyage of the Damned
2 nominations: Carrie, Face to Face, Fellini's Casanova, The Incredible Sarah, King Kong, Logan's Run, The Omen and The Seven-Per-Cent Solution

The following films received multiple awards.
4 wins: All the President's Men and Network
3 wins: Rocky
2 wins: Bound for Glory

Presenters and performers
The following individuals, listed in order of appearance, presented awards or performed musical numbers.

Presenters

Performers

See also
 34th Golden Globe Awards
 1976 in film
 19th Grammy Awards
 28th Primetime Emmy Awards
 29th Primetime Emmy Awards
 30th British Academy Film Awards
 31st Tony Awards

References

Academy Awards ceremonies
1976 film awards
1977 in Los Angeles
1977 in American cinema
March 1977 events in the United States
Academy
Television shows directed by Marty Pasetta